William Erskine may refer to:

William Erskine (master of Charterhouse) (died 1685), master of Charterhouse Hospital
William Erskine (died 1697), member of the Parliament of Scotland for Culross
William Erskine (1691–1754), member of the Parliament of Great Britain for Perth Burghs
Sir William Erskine, 1st Baronet (1728–1795), British Army officer
William Erskine, Lord Kinneder (1768–1822), Scottish scholar and songwriter
Sir William Erskine, 2nd Baronet (1770–1813), British Army officer and Member of Parliament
William Erskine (historian) (1773–1852), Scottish orientalist and historian
William Erskine (diplomat) (1871–1952), British ambassador